The 15th Arkansas Infantry Regiment was the designation of several units of the Confederate Army during the American Civil War. They were: 

 15th Arkansas Infantry Regiment (Josey's), formed May 1861 as Cleburne's Regt. Became Josey's Regt in December 1862, served until April 1865 
 15th Arkansas Infantry Regiment (Johnson's), formed January 1862 as Gee's Regt. Finished at Ft Donelson February 1862. Reformed as Johnson's Regt, finished at Port Hudson July 1863 
 15th (Northwest) Arkansas Infantry Regiment, formed July 1861 as MacRae's Regt. Finished at Vicksburg July 1863 

Military units and formations disambiguation pages